Moore's Building is a historic building located in the downtown area of the Hamlet of Oyster Bay and listed on the National Register of Historic Places. First built in 1901, the building gained significance when Theodore Roosevelt had his staff take offices here while he served as U.S. President. The Moore's Building is listed on the National Register of Historic Places, a Town of Oyster Bay Landmark, and a featured site on the Oyster Bay History Walk audio walking tour.

History
This landmark building with its Queen Anne style tower and cornices is called the Moore Building, but when James Moore originally built it in 1891 to house his corner grocery store, it had a much more humble appearance. Mr. Moore also built a row of attached wood buildings extending up East Main Street, which housed various shops such as Oyster Bay's first ice cream parlor, a furniture store, and an undertaker. Only five years after they had been built, several of these buildings were destroyed by a fire which broke out in the middle of the night.

Fortunately, the newly formed Atlantic Steamer Fire Company had invested in the Silsby Steamer, which extinguished the fire in time to save Moore's Grocery. In 1901, Moore built the statuesque building you see today, incorporating the original brick facade. It included a large ground floor for his growing grocery business and high-ceiling upper floors, in which public meetings could be held just as they had been across the street in Old Fleets Hall. But these upper floors were to rise to ever greater fame - when President Theodore Roosevelt outgrew his suite of offices at the Oyster Bay Bank Building on Audrey Avenue. While Sagamore Hill served as the Summer White House, Moore's Building now housed the Summer Executive Offices where Secretary William Loeb, Jr. and his staff conducted any business of the President which did not require his personal attention.

Secretary Loeb installed telegraph and telephone "hotlines" which connected directly to Sagamore Hill and the White House in Washington, D.C., and in 1903, the first "round the world" cable was transmitted from this building.

In recent years several restaurants have graced this lovely corner which was restored to its original beauty in 1995.

See also
 Oyster Bay History Walk
 Theodore Roosevelt in Oyster Bay
 List of Town of Oyster Bay Landmarks
 National Register of Historic Places listings in Nassau County, New York

References

External links
 Oyster Bay Main Street Association - Moore's Building
 Wild Honey Restaurant

Commercial buildings on the National Register of Historic Places in New York (state)
Queen Anne architecture in New York (state)
Landmarks in Oyster Bay (town), New York
Commercial buildings completed in 1901
Town of Oyster Bay Landmark
Buildings and structures in Nassau County, New York
National Register of Historic Places in Oyster Bay (town), New York